Grassy Creek is a stream in Pike County in the U.S. state of Missouri. It is a tributary of the Salt River.

Grassy Creek was so named on account of bluegrass in the area.

See also
List of rivers of Missouri

References

Rivers of Pike County, Missouri
Rivers of Missouri